This list is of the Cultural Properties of Japan designated in the category of  for the Prefecture of Tottori.

National Cultural Properties
As of 1 July 2019, three Important Cultural Properties have been designated (including one *National Treasure), being of national significance.

Prefectural Cultural Properties
As of 1 May 2019, twenty-six properties have been designated at a prefectural level.

See also
 Cultural Properties of Japan
 List of National Treasures of Japan (paintings)
 Japanese painting
 Kamiyodo Haiji
 List of Historic Sites of Japan (Tottori)
 List of Museums in Tottori Prefecture

References

External links
  Cultural Properties in Tottori Prefecture

Cultural Properties,Tottori
Cultural Properties,Paintings
Paintings,Tottori
Lists of paintings